The 1995 World Table Tennis Championships men's doubles was the 43rd edition of the men's doubles championship.

Wang Tao and Lü Lin won the title after defeating Zoran Primorac and Vladimir Samsonov in the final by three sets to one.

Results

See also
 List of World Table Tennis Championships medalists

References

-